Shmuel Hurwitz (12 September 1901 – 1999) was an Israeli agronomist.

Biography 
Hurwitz was born in Minsk, then in the Russian Empire (now in Belarus), and studied in Moscow. He was a close friend of the poet Saul Tchernichovsky, with whom he shared accommodation. In 1917, his sister was murdered by an antisemitic gang in Ukraine. In 1924, Hurwitz was arrested for his Zionist activities, and after spending a few months in prison, in 1925 he emigrated to Mandate Palestine (now Israel). He was initially a member of Kibbutz Gesher, until 1926, but subsequent went to Germany to study at the College of Agriculture in Berlin.

From 1933 until 1954, Hurwitz worked at the Agricultural Research Station of the Jewish Agency in Rehovot, and was among its founders. In 1953, he became professor at Hebrew University of Jerusalem, and was appointed Dean of the Faculty of Agriculture in 1964.

Awards 
 In 1957, Hurwitz was awarded the Israel Prize, for agriculture.

See also 
List of Israel Prize recipients
Hurwitz

References 

1901 births
1999 deaths
People from Minsky Uyezd
Belarusian Jews
Soviet emigrants to Mandatory Palestine
Jews in Mandatory Palestine
Israeli people of Belarusian-Jewish descent
Jewish scientists
Israeli agronomists
Academic staff of the Hebrew University of Jerusalem
Israel Prize in agriculture recipients
20th-century agronomists